Jeffrey Kaplan (born 1954) is an American academic who has written and edited a number of books on racism, religious violence, terrorism and the far right. He is an associate professor of religion at the University of Wisconsin–Oshkosh and a member of the board of academic advisors of the university's Institute for the Study of Religion, Violence and Memory.

Kaplan sits on the editorial boards of the journals Terrorism and Political Violence, Nova Religio and The Pomegranate.

Education
Kaplan earned an M.A. in Linguistics from Colorado State University in 1981; a M.A. in international relations from The Fletcher School of Law and Diplomacy in 1989; and earned a Ph.D. in the history of culture from the University of Chicago in 1993, with a thesis titled Revolutionary Millenarianism in the Modern World: From Christian Identity to Gush Emunim.

Career
Kaplan was an associate professor of history at Iḷisaġvik College in Utqiagvik, Alaska.

Kaplan was awarded a Guggenheim Foundation Research Grant for a project on "The Emergence of a Violent Euro-American Radical Right" with Leonard Weinberg. Kaplan occupied the Bicentennial Fulbright Chair in American Studies at the University of Helsinki in Finland from 1998 to 1999.

Publications
Radical Religion in America: Millenarian Movements From the Far Right to the Children of Noah (1997). Published by Syracuse University Press as a 245-page hardcover and paperback.
Nation and Race: The Developing Euro-American Racist Subculture (1998; co-edited with Tore Bjørgo). Published in Boston by Northeastern University Press as a 273-page hardcover and paperback.
The Emergence of a Euro-American Radical Right (1998; co-authored with Leonard Weinberg). Published in New Brunswick, New Jersey, by Rutgers University Press as a 238-page hardcover and paperback.
Beyond the Mainstream: The Emergence of Religious Pluralism in Finland, Estonia, and Russia (2000). Published in Helsinki by SKS as a 386-page hardcover?.
Encyclopedia of White Power: A Sourcebook on the Radical Racist Right (2000). Published in Walnut Creek, California, by Altamira Press as a 585-page hardcover in 2000.
The Cultic Milieu: Oppositional Subcultures in an Age of Globalization (2002; co-edited with ). Published in Walnut Creek, California, by AltaMira Press as a 353-page hardcover and paperback.
Millennial Violence: Past, Present and Future (2002; as editor). Originally appearing as a special issue of Terrorism and Political Violence (Vol. 14, No. 1; Spring 2002), it was published in London and Portland, Oregon by F. Cass as a 318-page hardcover and paperback.
The Encyclopedia of Religion and Nature (2005; consulting editor, with editor-in-chief Bron Taylor). Published in London and New York by Thoemmes Continuum in 2 volumes, totaling 1877 pages, in hardcover. It was published in paperback in 2008
 Terrorist Groups and the New Tribalism: Terrorism's Fifth Wave (2010). Published in Abingdon, Oxon, and New York by Routledge as a 235-page hardcover and e-book.
 Radical Religion and Violence: Theory and Case Studies Published in New York by Routledge as a 496-page hardcover

References

American religion academics
1954 births
Living people
People from Utqiagvik, Alaska
University of Wisconsin–Oshkosh faculty
Researchers of new religious movements and cults
Academics and writers on far-right extremism
Iḷisaġvik College faculty